There are 31 Industrial Assessment Centers in the United States as of June 2021. These centers are located at universities across the US, and are funded by the United States Department of Energy (DOE) to spread ideas relating to industrial energy conservation.

The centers conduct research into energy conservation techniques for industrial applications. This is accomplished by performing energy audits or assessments at manufacturers near the particular center. The IAC program has achieved over $890 million of implemented and $2.6 billion of recommended energy cost savings since its inception.

History
Industrial Assessment Centers (formerly called the Energy Analysis and Diagnostic Center (EADC) program) were created by the Department of Commerce in 1976 and later moved to the DOE.  The IAC program is administered through the Advanced Manufacturing Office under the Office of Energy Efficiency and Renewable Energy. The Centers were created to help small and medium-sized manufacturing facilities cut back on unnecessary costs from inefficient energy use, ineffective production procedures, excess waste production, and other production-related problems. According to instructions from DOE, currently the centers are only required to focus on reducing wasted energy and increasing energy efficiency. While this remains the primary focus of the assessments, waste reduction and productivity improvements are still commonly recommended.

Other Benefits
In addition to providing technical support to small to mid-sized manufacturers through energy assessments, the IAC program offers several other important benefits. Apart from the routine energy audits which cover a broad scope of industrial settings and subsystems, the IACs provide technical material and workshops promoting energy efficiency.

IAC Database
Rutgers University maintains a large databases of energy efficiency projects in the industrial sector.  The database contains recommendations from every audit completed by an IAC dating back to 1980.  As of June 2021, the IAC program had finished 19,470 assessments and made over 146,500 recommendations.  This database is free and open to the public.

IAC Alumni
The IAC program helps train the next generation of energy efficiency engineers.

Participating Universities
Map of Centers and Contact Information

 Arizona State University
 Boise State University
Case Western Reserve University
 Clemson University
Colorado State University
 Georgia Institute of Technology
 Indiana University – Purdue University Indianapolis
 Lehigh University
 Louisiana State University
 Michigan State University
 North Carolina State
 Oklahoma State University
 Oregon State University
 San Diego State University
 San Francisco State University
 Syracuse University
 Tennessee Technological University
Texas A&M University
 University of Alabama
 University of Dayton
University of Delaware
 University of Florida
University of Illinois, Chicago
 University of Kentucky
University of Massachusetts Amherst
University of Miami
University of Missouri
University of Nebraska-Lincoln
University of Texas Rio Grande Valley
 University of Utah
 University of Wisconsin, Milwaukee
 West Virginia University

References

External links
IAC Websites:

 Arizona State University
 Boise State University
 Case Western Reserve University
 Clemson University
 Colorado State University
 Georgia Institute of Technology
 IAC Indiana University – Purdue University Indianapolis
 Lehigh University
 Louisiana State University
 North Carolina State University
 Oklahoma State University
 Oregon State University
 San Diego State University
 San Francisco State University
 Syracuse University
 Tennessee Technological University
 Texas A&M University
 University of Alabama
 University of Dayton
 University of Delaware
 University of Florida
 University of Illinois, Chicago
 University of Kentucky
 University of Massachusetts Amherst
 University of Miami
 University of Missouri
 University of Nebraska-Lincoln
 University of Texas Rio Grande Valley
 University of Utah
 University of Wisconsin–Milwaukee
 West Virginia University

IAC Field Management Office:

 
 Rutgers Center for Advanced Energy Systems

Energy engineering
Energy conservation in the United States
Energy research institutes